Beishanichthys is an extinct genus of scanilepiform bony fish which existed in Gansu Province, China during the early Triassic period. It is based on fossils from the Lower Triassic lake deposits exposed in Beishan area. It was first named by Guang-Hui Xu, Ke-Qin Gao in 2011 and the type species is Beishanichthys brevicaudalis.

References

Triassic bony fish
Fossil taxa described in 2011
Fossils of China
Cladistia